Francesco Redenti (1820–1876)  was an Italian painter  of the 19th century. He was born in Correggio and was employed in drawing caricatures for the Fischietto. He died at Turin.

References

1820 births
1876 deaths
People from Correggio, Emilia-Romagna
19th-century Italian painters
Italian male painters
Italian Baroque painters
Painters from Bologna
19th-century Italian male artists